Satlu (also Romanized as Sā‘tlū, Sā‘atlū, and Saatlu; also known as Sā‘atlū-ye Bīvaleh) is a village in Baranduzchay-ye Shomali Rural District, in the Central District of Urmia County, West Azerbaijan Province, Iran. At the 2006 census, its population was 77, in 29 families.

References 

Populated places in Urmia County